Joe Klecker (born November 16, 1996) is an American distance runner. He finished 2nd in the NCAA DI XC Championships in 2019 and turned pro with On Running, coached by Dathan Ritzenhein in 2020. Klecker holds PRs of 3:37.55 for 1500m, 7:39.18 for 3000m, 12:54.99 for 5000m, and 27:23.44 for 10000m, all of which were set in his Professional Career.

Klecker attended Hopkins High School in Minnetonka, Minnesota. He graduated in 2015 and attended the University of Colorado in the Fall. At Colorado, he was a 9-time All-American in all 3 running sports including 2 runner-up finishes. He is currently the school's record holder in the indoor 5000m.

Family
Joe is the son of Barney and Janis Klecker, both professional marathoners (winners of Grandma's Marathon and Twin Cities Marathon in Minnesota) and both US national record holders, in the 50-mile and 50K run, respectively.

Running career

High school and recruitment
Klecker had a successful high school career, leading to two individual state championships his senior year. He was also named the Gatorade Minnesota Boys Track & Field Athlete of the Year during his senior year. Klecker set a 1600m state record of 4:06.54. He considered Minnesota, Furman, Georgetown and Tulsa before choosing Colorado.

Collegiate

Klecker chose to redshirt his Freshman season of Cross Country but competed in indoor and outdoor track, setting PRs of 3:44.55 for 1500m, 7:59.77 for 3000m, and 13:44.23 for 5000m. The 5000m time was good enough to qualify him for the West Preliminary round, the outdoor qualifier for the NCAA DI Championships.

Klecker picked up his first all-american honors at the 2016 NCAA DI XC Championships, placing 28th. He ran track PRs of 7:51.43 for 3000m, 13:42.64 for 5000m, and 3:41.69 for 1500m. Klecker placed 4th at the 2017 NCAA DI Indoor Track and Field Championship in the 3000m, and 7th in the Outdoor Championships for 5000m.

Klecker won the NCAA Mountain region championships and placed 2nd at the Pac-12 Championship for Cross country. Klecker did not repeat his All-American status his Junior year of cross country, placing 67th at the championship race. He did not race indoor or outdoor track for Colorado the following winter and spring. Klecker ran a PR in the 5000m in June 2018, with a time of 13:30.09.

In 2018, Klecker repeated as the Mountain Region Champion, and placed 8th in the NCAA XC Championships, his first time in the top 10. On February 23, 2019, he ran 3:58.51 in the Mile in Seattle, WA. In doing so, he became the 538th American to break 4 minutes in the Mile. He finished 2nd in the NCAA Indoor 5000m to Morgan McDonald and 3rd in the 3000m to McDonald and Grant Fisher. He did not race in the outdoor championships due to a mid-season injury.

During his 2019 XC campaign, Klecker won the Pac-12 Championships. At the NCAA Championships, he finished 2nd to Edwin Kurgat, leading Colorado to a 3rd-place team finish. Klecker went on to run a 3000m personal record of 7:47.57, but the indoor championships were cancelled due to the COVID-19 pandemic as well as the entire outdoor season.

Turning Pro
In August 2020, Klecker became a professional runner for On Athletics Club, a newly formed group mostly composed of recent collegiate runners including Oliver Hoare and Alicia Monson. The group is coached by Dathan Ritzenhein.

Professional career
Under Ritzenhein, Klecker ran personal bests of 3:37.55 for 1500m, 13:28.98 for 5000m and 27:35.57 during the second half of 2020.

On February 6, 2021, Klecker opened his season at the Prickly Pear Invitational in Phoenix, AZ. He placed fourth to Bowerman Track Club teammates Marc Scott, Grant Fisher, and Sean McGorty. Klecker's time of 7:39.18 was a personal record and his first time under 7:40. One week later, he competed in the New Balance Indoor Grand Prix in New York, NY. He finished 2nd to Justyn Knight in the 2-mile with a time of 8:14.20. His 3000m split en-route was 7:44.91, good for an indoor personal best. On March 6, 2021, he ran a 22-second personal best of 13:06.67 for 5000m at the Sound Running Invite in California. This performance earned him fourth place (again behind Bowerman teammates Fisher, Scott, and McGorty) in the race and made him the 18th fastest American ever over the distance.

He ran a 10K p.r. of 27:23.44 in Irvine, California on May 14, 2021. Klecker made his first Olympic team on June 18, 2021, at the U.S. Olympic Trials. He finished 3rd in the 10,000m running 27:54.90 with a final lap of 54.54 behind Bowerman athletes Woody Kincaid and Grant Fisher. He became the first U.S. athlete with the "On Athletics Club," coached by Dathan Ritzenhein to make the Olympic team. At the 2020 Olympic Games, Klecker finished 16th in the men's 10,000m final with a time of 28:14.18. After the Olympics, he set a personal best of 8:11.55 in the 2 Mile at the Prefontaine Classic. He finished 11th at the Fifth Avenue Mile.

On May 29, 2022, he won the U.S. championship 10000m. With a blazing final lap of 54.81, Klecker finished in 28.28.71, qualifying for the U.S. Team at the World Athletic Championships (WAC) and edging new American record holder Grant Fisher. Fisher had set an American Record of 26:33.84 in March. On July 16, 2022, again at Hayward Field in Eugene at the WAC, Klecker ran with the leaders for over 23 laps, a tactical race, finishing 8th in 27:37.73, behind the winner Joshua Cheptegei. In that race, Fisher took fourth in 27:28.14, just a quarter second behind the silver medalist. 

On January 27th, 2023 Klecker broke the 13 minute barrier in the 5K, running 12:54.99 at the John Thomas Terrier Classic held at Boston University. He finished second in the race to Woody Kincaid, who broke the American record in 12:51.61. Klecker was paced for just over two miles by teammate Ollie Hoare and led after Hoare stepped off the track. He was able to gap Kincaid by over a second heading into the final lap, but Kincaid closed in a fast 26.27 seconds for his final 200m while Klecker could only manage a 31.03. Klecker's time was good for 7th fastest ever in the world indoors and 3rd fastest American indoors. He became the 11th American to break 13 minutes in the 5K. Two weeks later, Klecker finished 3rd place at the Millrose Games in New York City at the Armory. His time of 7:34.14 was a personal record and ranks him 4th on the all-time American indoor list.

References 

1996 births
Living people
University of Colorado Boulder alumni
American male long-distance runners
American middle-distance runners
Track and field athletes from Minneapolis
Athletes (track and field) at the 2020 Summer Olympics
Olympic track and field athletes of the United States
Colorado Buffaloes men's track and field athletes
Colorado Buffaloes men's cross country runners
Hopkins High School alumni